Emmer wheat or hulled wheat is a type of awned wheat.  Emmer is a tetraploid (4n = 4x = 28 chromosomes).  The domesticated types are Triticum turgidum subsp. dicoccum and Triticum turgidum conv. durum. The wild plant is called Triticum turgidum subsp. dicoccoides.  The principal difference between the wild and the domestic is that the ripened seed head of the wild plant shatters and scatters the seed onto the ground, while in the domesticated emmer the seed head remains intact, thus making it easier for humans to harvest the grain.<ref>Weiss, Ehud and Zohary, Daniel (October 2011), "The Neolithic Southwest Asian Founder Crops, Current Anthropology, Vo 52, Supplement 4, p. S240</ref>

Along with einkorn wheat, emmer was one of the first crops domesticated in the Near East. It was widely cultivated in the ancient world, but is now a relict crop in mountainous regions of Europe and Asia.

Emmer is considered a type of farro food especially in Italy.

Taxonomy
Strong similarities in morphology and genetics show that wild emmer (Triticum dicoccoides Koern.) is the wild ancestor and a crop wild relative of domesticated emmer. Because wild and domesticated emmer are interfertile with other tetraploid wheats, some taxonomists consider all tetraploid wheats to belong to one species, T. turgidum. Under this scheme, the two forms are recognized at subspecies level, thus T. turgidum subsp. dicoccoides and T. turgidum subsp. dicoccum. Either naming system is equally valid; the latter lays more emphasis on genetic similarities.For a wider discussion, see Wheat#Genetics and breeding and Wheat taxonomyWild emmer
Wild emmer grows wild in the Near East. It is a tetraploid wheat formed by the hybridization of two diploid wild grasses, Triticum urartu, closely related to wild einkorn (T. boeoticum), and an as yet unidentified Aegilops species related to A. searsii or A. speltoides.

Botanists Körnicke and Aaronsohn in the late 19th-century were the first to describe the wild emmer (Triticum dicoccoides) native to Palestine and adjacent countries. Earlier, in 1864, the Austrian botanist Kotschy had collected specimens of the same wild emmer, without signifying where he had collected them.

Although cultivated in ancient Egypt, its cultivation for human consumption in Israel in recent history is not known, perhaps owing to the difficulty with which the chaff is separated from the seed kernels, formerly requiring the spikes to be pounded with mortar and pestle.

The wild emmer is distinguished from Triticum vulgare, with its tougher ear rhachis and the beards releasing the grains easily, by their ear rhachis that are brittle when ripe and their firmly fitting beards.

Morphology

Like einkorn and spelt wheats, emmer is a hulled wheat, meaning it has strong glumes (husks) that enclose the grains, and a semibrittle rachis. On threshing, a hulled wheat spike breaks up into spikelets. These require milling or pounding to release the grains from the glumes.

Wild emmer wheat spikelets effectively self-cultivate by propelling themselves mechanically into soils with their awns.  During a period of increased humidity during the night, the awns of the spikelet become erect and draw together, and in the process push the grain into the soil.  During the daytime, the humidity drops and the awns slacken back again; however, fine silica hairs on the awns act as hooks in the soil and prevent the spikelets from backing out. During the course of alternating stages of daytime drying and nighttime humidity, the awns' pumping movements, which resemble a swimming frog kick, will drill the spikelet  or more into the soil.

Etymology
First use: 1908

History
Wild emmer is native to the Fertile Crescent of the Middle East, growing in the grass and woodland of hill country from modern-day Israel to Iran.  The origin of wild emmer has been suggested, without universal agreement among scholars, to be the Karaca Dağ mountain region of southeastern Turkey. In 1906, Aaron Aaronsohn's discovery of wild emmer wheat growing in Rosh Pinna (Israel) created a stir in the botanical world. Emmer wheat has been found in archaeological excavations and ancient tombs.  Emmer was collected from the wild and eaten by hunter gatherers for thousands of years before its domestication.  Grains of wild emmer discovered at Ohalo II had a radiocarbon dating of 17,000 BC and at the Pre-Pottery Neolithic A (PPNA) site of Netiv Hagdud are 10,000–9,400 years old.

The location of the earliest site of emmer domestication is still unclear and under debate.  Some of the earliest sites with possible indirect evidence for emmer domestication during the Early Pre-Pottery Neolithic B include Tell Aswad, Çayönü, Cafer Höyük, Aşıklı Höyük,  and Shillourokambos. Definitive evidence for the full domestication of emmer wheat is not found until the Middle Pre-Pottery Neolithic B (10,200 to 9,500 BP), at sites such as Beidha, Tell Ghoraifé, Tell es-Sultan (Jericho), Abu Hureyra, Tell Halula,  Tell Aswad and Cafer Höyük.

Emmer is found in a large number of Neolithic sites scattered around the fertile crescent.  From its earliest days of cultivation, emmer was a more prominent crop than its cereal contemporaries and competitors, einkorn wheat and barley. Small quantities of emmer are present during Period 1 at Mehrgharh on the Indian subcontinent, showing that emmer was already cultivated there by 7000–5000 BC.

In the Near East, in southern Mesopotamia in particular, cultivation of emmer wheat began to decline in the Early Bronze Age, from about 3000 BC, and barley became the standard cereal crop. This has been related to increased salinization of irrigated alluvial soils, of which barley is more tolerant, although this study has been challenged. Emmer had a special place in ancient Egypt, where it was the main wheat cultivated in Pharaonic times, although cultivated einkorn wheat was grown in great abundance during the Third Dynasty, and large quantities of it were found preserved, along with cultivated emmer wheat and barleys, in the subterranean chambers beneath the Step Pyramid at Saqqara. Neighbouring countries also cultivated einkorn, durum and common wheat. In the absence of any obvious functional explanation, the greater prevalence of emmer wheat in the diet of ancient Egypt may simply reflect a marked culinary or cultural preference, or may reflect growing conditions having changed after the Third Dynasty. Emmer and barley were the primary ingredients in ancient Egyptian bread and beer. Emmer recovered from the Phoenician  settlement at Volubilis (in present-day Morocco) has been dated to the middle of the first millennium BC.

Emmer wheat may be one of the five species of grain which have a special status in Judaism. However, it is fairly certain that spelt did not grow in ancient Israel, and emmer was probably a significant crop until the end of the Iron Age. References to emmer in Greek and Latin texts are traditionally translated as "spelt", even though spelt was not common in the Classical world until very late in its history.

In northeastern Europe, emmer (in addition to einkorn and barley) was one of the most important cereal species and this importance can be seen to increase from 3400 BC onward. Pliny the Elder notes that although emmer was called  in his time formerly it was called  (or 'glory'), providing an etymology explaining that emmer had been held in glory (N.H. 18.3), and later in the same book he describes its role in sacrifices.

Cultivation
Today emmer is primarily a relict crop in mountainous areas. Its value lies in its ability to give good yields on poor soils, and its resistance to fungal diseases such as stem rust that are prevalent in wet areas. Emmer is grown in Armenia, Morocco, Spain (Asturias), the Carpathian mountains on the border of Czechia and Slovakia, Albania, Turkey, Switzerland, Germany, Greece and  Italy. It is also grown in the U.S. as a specialty product. A traditional food plant in Ethiopia, this relatively little-known grain has potential to improve nutrition, boost food security, foster rural development and support sustainable landcare.

In Italy, uniquely, emmer cultivation is well established and even expanding. In the mountainous Garfagnana area of Tuscany emmer (known as farro) is grown by farmers as an IGP (Indicazione Geografica Protetta) product, with its geographic identity protected by law. Production is certified by a co-operative body, the Consorzio Produttori Farro della Garfagnana. IGP-certified farro is widely available in health food shops across Europe, and even in some British supermarkets. The demand for Italian farro has led to competition from non-certified farro, grown in lowland areas and often consisting of a different wheat species, spelt (Triticum spelta).

Food uses

Emmer's main use is as a human food, though it is also used for animal feed. Ethnographic evidence from Turkey and other emmer-growing areas suggests that emmer makes good bread (judged by the taste and texture standards of traditional bread), and this is supported by evidence of its widespread consumption as bread in ancient Egypt. Emmer bread is available in Switzerland and the Netherlands. The largest Dutch supermarket chain in the Netherlands, Albert Heijn, sells emmer bread as part of their luxury bread line.

In Armenian cuisine, emmer pilaf is cooked in sunflower oil. The pre-cooked emmer is fried in oil and then the sautéed onions are added. In the second version, boiled water and emmer are added to the sautéed onion and then cooked until tender. 
In Armenia, emmer porridge with lamb called "kashovi" is widespread in the Shirak region, while lean kashovi is known in all regions of Armenia. Chopped lamb is added to cold water then boiled for 10 minutes, emmer and sautéed onion are added and cooked over a low heat until tender. 

In Italy, whole emmer grains can be easily found in most supermarkets and groceries, emmer bread (pane di farro'') can be found in bakeries in some areas, while in Tuscany emmer has traditionally been consumed as whole grains in soup. Emmer has also been used in beer production.

In parts of India, emmer wheat (in Maharashtra called खपली गहू, transcription "khapalī gahū", meaning "crusty wheat") is grown as a drought- and stress-resistant wheat variety with some work ongoing to improve yields, as a result of increased interest in this variety due to possible value for diabetics.

As with all varieties and hybrids of wheat, emmer is unsuitable for people with gluten-related disorders, such as celiac disease, non-celiac gluten sensitivity and wheat allergy sufferers, among others.

References

References

Hulled Wheats. Promoting the conservation and use of underutilized and neglected crops. 4. Proceedings of the First International Workshop on Hulled Wheats 21–22 July 1995, Castelvecchio Pascoli, Tuscany, Italy[invalid link]
 Up-to-date reference to cereals in the Biblical world.
Wheat evolution: integrating archaeological and biological evidence
Alternative Wheat Cereals as Food Grains: Einkorn, Emmer, Spelt, Kamut, and Triticale

Oldest domesticated wheat found at Abu Hureyra.

External links
 

Wheat cultivars
Founder crops